Events from the year 1921 in Ireland.

Events
1 February
Captain Con Murphy from near Millstreet, County Cork is executed by British authorities, the first man to be executed in front of a firing squad since the 1916 Rising.
The Irish White Cross is established to distribute funds raised by the American Committee for Relief in Ireland.
4 February – Irish War of Independence: Irish Republican Army sets fire to Summerhill House in County Meath, destroying it.
5 February – in Brighton, England, the widow of Charles Stewart Parnell, Katherine Parnell, dies aged 76.
5 March – Irish War of Independence: Clonbanin Ambush: Irish Republican Army kills Brigadier General Cumming.
16–17 March – Irish War of Independence: Irish Republican Army kills two Royal Irish Constabulary constables in Clifden; Black and Tans, called in, kill one civilian, seriously injure another, burn 14 houses and damage several others.
19 March – Irish War of Independence: Crossbarry Ambush: British troops fail to encircle an outnumbered column of Irish Republican Army volunteers in County Cork, with at least ten British and three IRA deaths.
21 March – Irish War of Independence: Headford Ambush: Irish Republican Army kills at least nine British troops.
27 April – Viscount FitzAlan of Derwent is appointed Lord Lieutenant of Ireland, the first Roman Catholic granted the office since 1685.
3 May – the state of Northern Ireland is created within the United Kingdom under terms of the Government of Ireland Act 1920.
13 May – Irish elections, under terms of the Government of Ireland Act 1920: At close of nomination for elections to the new Parliament of Southern Ireland, all 128 candidates are returned unopposed and deemed elected. All 124 Sinn Féin candidates regard themselves as elected to the Second Dáil.
24 May – Irish elections, under terms of the Government of Ireland Act 1920: In the Northern Ireland general election for the new Parliament of Northern Ireland (held by single transferable vote), it is apparent by 29 May that the Unionists have a substantial majority (40 out of 52 seats).
25 May – Irish War of Independence: The Irish Republican Army occupies and burns The Custom House in Dublin, the centre of local government in Ireland. Five IRA men are killed and over eighty captured by the British Army which surrounds the building.
7 June – the forty elected Unionist Members of Parliament gather in Belfast City Hall. James Craig is elected as the first Prime Minister of Northern Ireland.
20 June – Irish War of Independence: British Major-General Lambert dies at Athlone of a gunshot wound sustained in an IRA ambush; early on 2 July six farmhouses in the area are burned apparently in retaliation and the following day the IRA, in turn, burn down Moydrum Castle.
22 June – new Parliament of Northern Ireland meets at Belfast City Hall and is opened by George V of the United Kingdom, making a speech (drafted by Jan Smuts) calling for reconciliation in Ireland.
28 June – new Parliament of Southern Ireland meets at the Royal College of Science for Ireland in Merrion Street, Dublin and is opened by the Lord Lieutenant of Ireland, Viscount FitzAlan. In addition to the appointed Senate, only the four Unionist MPs representing Dublin University attend the House of Commons. Having elected Gerald Fitzgibbon to be Speaker, the House adjourns sine die. This is its only formal meeting and it never enacts any legislation.
4 July – James Craig refuses to attend a peace conference in Dublin because the invitation by President Éamon de Valera was addressed to him personally instead of to the Prime Minister of Northern Ireland.
8 July – at the Peace Conference in the Mansion House, Dublin, President de Valera accepts an invitation to meet the Prime Minister of the United Kingdom, David Lloyd George, in London.
10 July – Bloody Sunday: Clashes between Catholics and Protestants in Belfast result in 16 deaths (23 over the surrounding four-day period) and the destruction of over 200 (mostly Catholic) homes.
11 July – under the terms of the truce (signed on 9 July) which becomes effective at noon, the British Army agrees that there will be no provocative display of forces or incoming troops.  The Irish Republican Army agrees that attacks on Crown forces will cease.
21 July - The Belfast Pogrom begins with the one day removal of thousands of Belfast shipyard, factory and mill workers from their jobs.
16 August – following the uncontested election for the Parliament of Southern Ireland, 125 Sinn Féin Teachtaí Dála assemble as the Second Dáil at the Mansion House, Dublin. Six represent constituencies in Northern Ireland (five of them jointly with constituencies in the South).
23 August – the Northern Cabinet agrees that Stormont Castle will be the permanent site of the Northern Houses of Parliament.
7 September – David Lloyd George summons a meeting of the Cabinet of the United Kingdom at Inverness to discuss an independent Ireland's relationship with the British Empire.
8 September – David Lloyd George's final offer is delivered to Éamon de Valera. Sinn Féin is invited to discuss the proposals which would grant limited sovereignty within the British Empire.
14 September – Dáil Éireann selects five delegates to negotiate agreement with Lloyd George in London, including Michael Collins and Arthur Griffith.
8 October – the Irish delegation leaves for London to discuss the Treaty.
9 October – large crowds greet the Irish delegation at Euston Station in London. Griffith tells the crowd that de Valera will not travel to London.
11 October – The Irish Treaty Conference opens in London.
6 December – agreement is reached in the Anglo-Irish Treaty negotiations in London. The main points include the creation of an Irish Free State within the Commonwealth, an Oath of Allegiance to the Crown, and retention by the British naval services of the use of certain ports.
December – Éamon de Valera accuses the delegation to London of having ignored its instructions. Arthur Griffith accuses de Valera of knowing at the time that a Republic could not be achieved.
16 December – the British House of Commons accepts the Articles of Agreement. The House of Lords also votes to accept the Treaty by a large majority.
Bethany Home established in Dublin as a home for Protestant unmarried mothers, reformed prostitutes and those convicted of petty offences.

Arts and literature
6 January – George Shiels' play Bedmates is premiered at the Abbey Theatre, Dublin.
24 February – Terence MacSwiney's play The Revolutionist (set and published in 1914) has its stage premiere posthumously at the Abbey Theatre. His writings Principles of Freedom are collected from Irish Freedom (1911–12) and published this year also.
Ina Boyle's pastoral for orchestra Colin Clout is premiered.
George Moore publishes the novel Heloise and Abelard.
L. A. G. Strong publishes the poetry Dublin Days (in Oxford).
W. B. Yeats publishes the poetry Michael Robartes and the Dancer and Four Plays for Dancers.

Sport

Football
The new Football Association of Ireland is formed in Dublin after a split from the Belfast-based Irish Football Association. Shelbourne FC and Bohemian FC are amongst the eight founder members of the new League of Ireland. (See: FAI – Split from the IFA).

Gaelic Games
The All-Ireland Champions are Limerick (hurling) and Dublin (football)

Births
3 January – Eddie Gannon, soccer player (died 1989).
24 January
Sybil Connolly, fashion designer (died 1998).
Patrick Scott, painter (died 2014).
17 January – Donogh O'Malley, Fianna Fáil TD and Cabinet Minister (died 1968).
22 February – Cecil King, painter (died 1986).
8 March – James Comyn, Justice of the High Court of England (died 1997).
10 March – Bernard Devlin, Roman Catholic Bishop of the Diocese of Gibraltar.
21 March – Yaakov Herzog, Dublin-born Israeli diplomat (died 1972).
25 March – John Joe McGirl, chief of staff of the Irish Republican Army (died 1988).
14 April – Mona Tyndall, missionary sister and development worker (died 2000).
31 May – Billy Walsh, soccer player and manager (died 2006).
29 June – Desmond Leslie, pilot, filmmaker and writer (died 2001).
23 July – Malachi Martin, Roman Catholic priest and author (died 1999).
27 July – Tom Nolan, Fianna Fáil TD, Minister of State and MEP (died 1992).
22 August – Michael Yeats, Fianna Fáil Seanad member and MEP (died 2007).
8 September – Patrick Flynn, Liberal Party of Canada MP (died 1996).
22 November – Brian Cleeve, writer and television broadcaster (died 2003).
17 December – Alice Glenn, Fine Gael politician (died 2011).
24 December – Gerard Victory, composer (died 1995).
Full date unknown
Éamonn Young, Cork Gaelic footballer (died 2007).

Deaths
5 January – James Rankin, lighthouse keeper in America (born 1844).
21 April – Rosa Mulholland, Lady Gilbert, novelist, short-story writer and poet (born 1841).
28 April – Maurice Moore, Irish republican who fought in the Irish War of Independence, executed (born 1894).
9 June – Sir Henry Bellingham, 4th Baronet, politician and barrister (born 1846).
18 August – Samuel Cleland Davidson, inventor and engineer (born 1846).
9 October – Egerton Bushe Coghill, painter (born 1853).
10 December – George Ashlin, architect (born 1837).
Full date unknown
James Gogarty, took part in Easter Rising, first known I.R.B. casualty of the Irish War of Independence (born 1890).

References

External links
 "Sport in 1921: A tumultuous year at home and abroad", RTÉ.

 
1920s in Ireland
Ireland
Years of the 20th century in Ireland